Nikolai Aleksandrovich Doluda (born June 10, 1952, Mirolyubovka, Bohodukhiv Raion, Kharkiv Oblast) is a Russian political figure and a deputy the  8th State Duma. In 1998 he held the position of Deputy Mayor of the city of Yeysk. In 2001, he started working at the administration of the Krasnodar Krai. On May 24, 2006, he was appointed Deputy Governor of the Krasnodar Krai. In November 2007, Nikolai Doluda was elected ataman of the Kuban Cossack army. Three years later, he headed the Council of military atamans. He left the post in 2020 to become the new head of the All-Russian Cossack Society.

Since 2021, he has served as a deputy of the 8th State Duma.

On 24 March 2022, the United States Treasury sanctioned him in response to the 2022 Russian invasion of Ukraine.

Awards 

 Order of Honour
 Order of Friendship
 Medal of the Order "For Merit to the Fatherland"
 Jubilee Medal "60 Years of Victory in the Great Patriotic War 1941–1945"
 Medal "For the Return of Crimea"
 Medal "For Impeccable Service"

References

1952 births
Living people
United Russia politicians
21st-century Russian politicians
Eighth convocation members of the State Duma (Russian Federation)
Russian individuals subject to the U.S. Department of the Treasury sanctions